Moira (foaled April 11, 2019) is a Canadian-bred Thoroughbred racehorse who won the 2022 Woodbine Oaks and Queen's Plate. She set a track record in the Queen's Plate while becoming the 38th filly to win the race.

Background
Moira is a bay filly who was bred in Ontario by Adena Springs. She was sired by Ghostzapper, the 2004 American Horse of the Year after winning the Breeders' Cup Classic. Her dam, Devine Aida, is a graded stakes-placed daughter of Unbridled's Song. The family traces to Begum, a blind daughter of Alydar who became an outstanding producer. 

She was sold at the 2020 Keeneland Yearling Sale for $150,000 to X-Men Racing, a group of friends put together by bloodstock agent Donato Lanni. Lanni also brought American-based Madaket Stable and SF Racing into the partnership. "We put a fund together and we bought a dozen horses and she was one of them," said Lanni. "They're all guys that are in the horse business, some of them in the Standardbred business. But what they all have in common, besides being friends with me, is that they're all lucky." 

She is named after the character Moira Rose, played by Catherine O'Hara, from Schitt's Creek. She is trained by Kevin Attard.

Racing career
Moira made her first start on October 23, 2021, in the Princess Elizabeth Stakes at Woodbine Racetrack. She raced near the back of the pack for the first three-quarters of a mile, then started her move on the final turn. Bumped at the head of the stretch, she recovered her stride and made a strong late move to win by  lengths.

On November 28, Moira went off as the even-money favourite in the Mazarine Stakes. She settled near the back of the pack and made her move on the final turn, first on the outside and then on the inside as she looked for racing room. She closed late but was unable to get by Mrs. Barbara, who won by half a length.

2022: three-year-old season

Moira made her three-year-old debut on June 11, 2022, in the Fury Stakes at Woodbine. She raced in mid-pack for the first half-mile, then moved four-wide as the field turned into the stretch. She reached the lead in mid-stretch then held off a late run by Pioneer's Edge to win by a head.

In the Woodbine Oaks on July 24, Moira went off as the even-money favourite in a field of ten. She was nervous in the paddock before the race and stepped on one her hind hooves, knocking off one shoe and bending the other. The paddock blacksmith tried to fix the problem but Attard ultimately decided to run her without either hind shoe. Moira settled in mid-pack for the first half-mile then made her move on the far turn while racing three-wide. She quickly took the lead near the top of the stretch and continued to draw away to win by  lengths. "We just sat there and saved as much ground as we could," said jockey Rafael Hernandez. "I knew horses were going to be stopping in front of me, so I just tried to get her away from them. By the three-eighths [pole], I was already where I wanted to be." Her time of 1:49.78 for nine furlongs was 0.84 faster than the colts ran the Plate Trial later on the same day at Woodbine.

Moira made her first start against male horses on August 21 in the Queen's Plate, the first leg of the Canadian Triple Crown. She faced a competitive field, headed by Rondure (Marine Stakes) and Sir for Sure (Plate Trial). The betting favourite for much of the day, Moira ultimately went off at odds of 9–5, the second choice in the betting to Rondure, who received late support. All other horses in the field went off at double-digit odds. Attard kept the filly in the saddling enclosure before the race, trying to keep her from getting over-excited. "I could see she was getting a little edgy just because so many people were around," said Attard. "She knew today was a different day."

Moira settled near the back of the pack as the field moved down the stretch for the first time. She continued to race well back along the rail until the final turn when she was switched to the outside. Near the head of the stretch, she moved alongside the leaders and quickly drew away. She won easily by seven lengths, with Hernandez standing in the irons for the final strides. She set a track record for Woodbine's Tapeta surface of 2:01.48 for  miles, while running the fastest Queen's Plate in its 163-year history.

Moira is the 38th filly to win the Queen's Plate and the eighth to win both the Woodbine Oaks and Queen's Plate. It was the first Queen's Plate win for owner Lanni and trainer Attard. "I've known [Attard] for 20 years, and this has been a dream – a dream of his, mine – being two Canadian boys to win this race," said Lanni. "This is unbelievable. What a filly."

Moira made her next start on October 8 in the Grade I E. P. Taylor Stakes, running over turf for the first time while facing older fillies and mares. Going off as the 6–5 favourite, she raced in the middle of a tightly bunched field. In the stretch, she lacked racing room so Hernandez moved her sharply to the inside, cutting off another horse, Lemista, in the process. Although Moira was tight against the rail, she began to inch her way to the lead, only to be beaten at the wire by Rougir, who made a late run on the outside. Moira was subsequently disqualified to eighth place for interference with Lemista.

Moira's final start of the year was the Breeders' Cup Filly & Mare Turf on November 5, where she was ridden by Frankie Dettori. Breaking from the outside post, she was well back early but closed steadily in the stretch to finish fifth.

Statistics

An asterisk after the odds means Moira was the post-time favourite.

Pedigree

References

Racehorses trained in Canada
2019 racehorse births
King's Plate winners
Thoroughbred family 1-l
Racehorses bred in Ontario